The Bruno Rossi Prize is awarded annually by the High Energy Astrophysics division of the American Astronomical Society "for a significant contribution to High Energy Astrophysics, with particular emphasis on recent, original work". Named after astrophysicist Bruno Rossi, the prize is awarded with a certificate and a gift of USD $500, and was first awarded in 1985 to William R. Forman and Christine Jones Forman "for pioneering work in the study of X-ray emission from early type galaxies". It has been awarded 32 times. In 2010, the prize was awarded to William B. Atwood, Peter Michelson and the Fermi Gamma-ray Space Telescope team "for enabling, through the development of the Large Area Telescope, new insights into neutron stars, supernova remnants, cosmic rays, binary systems, active galactic nuclei, and gamma-ray bursts".  In 2013, the prize was awarded to Roger W. Romani of Leland Stanford Junior University and Alice Harding of Goddard Space Flight Center for their work in developing the theoretical framework underpinning the many exciting pulsar results from Fermi Gamma-ray Space Telescope.

List of winners

 1985 William R. Forman and Christine Jones Forman
 1986 Allan S. Jacobson
 1987 Michiel van der Klis
 1988 Rashid A. Sunyaev
 1989 IMB and Kamioka Experiment teams
 1990 Stirling Colgate
 1991 John A. Simpson
 1992 Gerald H. Share
 1993 Giovanni Bignami and Jules Halpern
 1994 Gerald J. Fishman
 1995 Carl Fichtel
 1996 Felix Mirabel and Luis F. Rodríguez
 1997 Trevor C. Weekes
 1998 The BeppoSAX Team and Jan van Paradijs
 1999 Jean Swank and Hale Bradt
 2000 Peter Meszaros, Bohdan Paczyński, and Martin Rees
 2001 Andrew Fabian and Yasuo Tanaka
 2002 Leon Van Speybroeck
 2003 Robert Duncan, Christopher Thompson, and Chryssa Kouveliotou
 2004 Harvey Tananbaum and Martin C. Weisskopf
 2005 Stan Woosley
 2006 Deepto Chakrabarty, Tod Strohmayer, and Rudy Wijnands
 2007 Neil Gehrels and the Swift team
 2008 Steve Allen, Pat Henry, Maxim Markevitch, and Alexey Vikhlinin
 2009 Charles D. Bailyn, Jeffrey E. McClintock, and Ronald A. Remillard
 2010 Felix A. Aharonian, Werner Hofmann, Heinrich J. Voelk and the H.E.S.S. team
 2011 William B. Atwood, Peter Michelson and the Fermi Gamma-ray Space Telescope LAT team
 2012 Marco Tavani and the AGILE Team
 2013 Roger W. Romani and Alice Harding
 2014 Douglas P. Finkbeiner, Tracy R. Slatyer and Meng Su for their discovery of the Fermi Bubbles.
 2015 Fiona A. Harrison
 2016 Niel Brandt
 2017 Gabriela González and the LIGO team
 2018 Colleen Wilson-Hodge and the Fermi Gamma-ray Space Telescope GBM team
 2019 Brian Metzger and Daniel Kasen
 2020 Sheperd Doeleman and The Event Horizon Telescope Collaboration  
 2021 Francis Halzen and the IceCube collaboration
 2022 Keith Gendreau, Zaven Arzoumanian and the team of the NICER

See also

 List of astronomy awards

References

Awards established in 1985
Astronomy prizes
1985 establishments in the United States
American Astronomical Society